Alalcomenes (Ancient Greek:  means 'guardian') or Alalcomeneus was in Greek mythology, a Boeotian autochthon who was believed to have given the name to the Boeotian town of Alalcomenae.

Mythology 
Alalcomeneus was also said to have brought-up/ tutored Athena (under the epithet Athena Alalcomeneis), who was in some traditions said to have been born in that town, and to have been the first who introduced her worship. According to Plutarch, he advised Zeus to have a figure of oak-wood dressed in bridal attire, and carried about amidst hymnal songs, in order to change the anger of Hera into jealousy. The name of the wife of Alalcomenes was Athenaïs, and that of his son, Glaucopus, both of which refer to the goddess Athena.

In some accounts, Alalcomenes was said to be the first man who appear by Lake Copais before even the Moon was. He sprang spontaneously from the earth (Gaia) rather than being created by Prometheus and thus one of the men of the so-called golden race, subjects of Cronus.

Interpretation 
Modern interpretation by Graves recognized Alalcomeneus as a fictitious character which is a masculine form of Alalcomeneïs, Athene's title (Iliad) as the guardian of Boeotia. He serves the patriarchal dogma that no woman, even a goddess, can be wise without male instruction, and that the Moon—goddess and the Moon itself were late creations of Zeus.

Notes

References 

 Graves, Robert, The Greek Myths, Harmondsworth, London, England, Penguin Books, 1960. 
Graves, Robert, The Greek Myths: The Complete and Definitive Edition. Penguin Books Limited. 2017. 
Pausanias, Description of Greece with an English Translation by W.H.S. Jones, Litt.D., and H.A. Ormerod, M.A., in 4 Volumes. Cambridge, MA, Harvard University Press; London, William Heinemann Ltd. 1918. Online version at the Perseus Digital Library
 Pausanias, Graeciae Descriptio. 3 vols. Leipzig, Teubner. 1903.  Greek text available at the Perseus Digital Library.
 Stephanus of Byzantium, Stephani Byzantii Ethnicorum quae supersunt, edited by August Meineike (1790-1870), published 1849. A few entries from this important ancient handbook of place names have been translated by Brady Kiesling. Online version at the Topos Text Project.

Autochthons of classical mythology
Children of Gaia
Demigods in classical mythology
Boeotian characters in Greek mythology